Václav František Červený (27 September 1819 – 19 January 1896) was a Czech brass instrument maker and inventor. He became the principal manufacturer in Austria-Hungary.

Inventions 
Červený was a prolific inventor, rivalling his French contemporary, Adolphe Sax in output and recognition. Many of his inventions were widely copied despite his patents, especially in France. Importantly, he invented a process for drawing conical bores from solid brass, which he used to invent several wide-bored conical instruments. The Cornon, patented in 1844 to substitute the french horn in military bands, went on to inspire the later Wagner tuba. Other instrument patents include the Serpentbombardon (a valved bass ophicleide), Armee-Posaune (a family of upright marching valve trombones in four sizes from alto to contrabass), and the circular-wrapped Kornett-Instrumente for performing salon music, notably taken up by the amateur musician, Tsar Alexander III of Russia. He is attributed with building the first contrabass tuba in 18′ B♭, and patented the Kaiserbass in 1884.

Many of Červený's conical bore instruments influenced the development of later instruments such as the tuba, euphonium, and modern marching band instruments.

Červený also patented percussion instrument inventions, including the Votiv-timpani and the Glocken-Akkordion (a form of altar bell).

After his death, his firm introduced in 1908 a line of highly compact  instruments, in particular tubas pitched in 12′ F and 18′ B♭ wrapped about the size of a modern tenor horn, and revived in the 21st century by Wessex as "travel tubas".

The Červený company 

Červený established his workshop with four employees in Königgrätz in 1842. After establishing an additional factory in Kyiv in 1867 it grew to over 100 workers by 1880. After Červený's death, the company became part of the nationalized instrument manufacturing cooperative Amati in 1948. It was subsequently re-privatised in 1993 using its Červený name after the dissolution of Czechoslovakia.

Honours
Červený's reputation as the leading brass maker in Austria-Hungary was widely acknowledged during his lifetime, receiving medals at universal exhibitions in Paris (in 1855, 1867, and the gold medal in 1889) and Chicago, and honours from several European heads of state.

References

Bibliography 

 
 
 

Czech musical instrument makers
Brass instruments
1819 births
1896 deaths
People from Hradec Králové